The Horticulture Building may refer to:

 Horticulture Building (Minnesota), Dakota County Fair, Farmington, Minnesota, U.S.
 Horticulture Building (Toronto) in Exhibition Place, Toronto, Ontario, Canada
 Horticulture Building in Lansdowne Park, Ottawa, Ontario, Canada